The Ferapontov convent, in the Vologda region of Russia, is considered one of the purest examples of Russian medieval art, a reason given by UNESCO for its inscription on the World Heritage List.

The monastery was founded by Saint Ferapont in 1398 in the inhospitable Russian North, to the east from the Kirillo-Belozersky Monastery, named after his fellow monk, Saint Cyril of Beloozero. The fame of the monastery started to spread under Kirill's disciple, Saint Martinian, who was to become a father superior of the Troitse-Sergiyeva Lavra in 1447.

Even after Martinian's death, his monastery was protected and favoured by members of Ivan III's family. The most ancient structure, the Cathedral of Nativity of the Virgin (1490), was built in brick by the masters of Rostov. This edifice is the best preserved of three sister cathedrals erected in the 1490s in the Russian North. All the interior walls are covered with invaluable frescoes by the great medieval painter Dionisius. This is the last surviving Russian medieval church with fully painted walls.

During the 1530s, they added a treasury, a refectory, and the unique Annunciation church surmounted by a belfry. At that time the monastery enjoyed special privileges conferred upon it by Ivan the Terrible, and possessed some 60 villages in the vicinity. The tsar himself frequently visited the monastery as a pilgrim.

In the Time of Troubles, the monastery was ravaged by the Poles. During its recovery the last buildings — the tent-like church of Saint Martinian (1641), a two-tented barbican church (1650), and a bell-tower (1680) — were added to the complex. The belfry clocks (1638) are said to be the oldest in Russia.

As the monastery gradually lost its religious importance, it was being turned into a place of exile for distinguished clerics, such as the Patriarch Nikon. It was abolished by Emperor Paul in 1798, reinstituted as a convent in 1904, closed by the Bolsheviks twenty years later, and turned into a museum in 1975. The museum constitutes a part of the Russky Sever (Russian North) National Park since 1991.

As of January 2013, images of the monastery and grounds were available via Google Street View.

External links
All the murals of the Ferapontov Monastery online
Official web page of the monastery

Religious buildings and structures completed in 1490
15th-century Russian Orthodox church buildings
Russian Orthodox monasteries in Russia
World Heritage Sites in Russia
Fresco paintings
Buildings and structures in Vologda Oblast
1398 establishments in Europe
14th-century establishments in Russia
Museums in Vologda Oblast
Art museums and galleries in Russia
Religious museums in Russia
Cultural heritage monuments of federal significance in Vologda Oblast